Stylonemataceae is a family of red algae in the class Stylonematophyceae. It is the only family in the monotypic order Stylonematales.

Genera and number of species  
 Bangiopsis F.Schmitz 3 
 Chroodactylon Hansgirg 3  
 Chroothece Hansgirg 9   
 Colacodictyon Feldmann 1
 Empselium G.I.Hansen & Scagel  1 
 Goniotrichiopsis G.M.Smith 2
 Kyliniella Skuja 1  
 Neevea Batters  1
 Purpureofilum J.A.West, Zuccarello & J.L.Scott 1 
 Rhodaphanes J.A.West, G.C.Zuccarello, J.L Scott & K.A.West 1
 Rhodosorus Geitler 2      
 Rhodospora Geitler 1    
 Stylonema Reinsch 19
 Tsunamia J.A.West, G.I.Hansen, Zuccarello & T.Hanyuda  1 
 Viator G.I.Hansen, J.A.West, & G.C.Zuccarello 1

Zachariasia Lemmermann, 1895 (with holotype Zachariasia endophytica Lemmermann) is currently regarded as a synonym of Chroothece. This should not be confused with Zachariasia Voigt 1901 non Lemmermann 1895, which is a synonym for Histiona (Histionidae, Discoba, Excavata).

References

External links 
 
 
 Stylonematacae at AlgaeBase

Red algae families
Stylonematophyceae